O Ateneu (English: The Athenaeum) is a novel written by the Brazilian author Raul Pompeia in 1888, which is considered one of the most prominent examples of Brazilian Naturalism, Impressionism and Realism. The book narrates, in the first person, the story of Sérgio, an eleven-year-old boy who is sent to a well-respected all-male boarding school—known as the Ateneu, hence the book's title—by his father. The Ateneu has very strict rules imposed by its headmaster—Aristarco—which cause a general sense of riot amongst the students; homosexuality is common amongst most students, which is partially explained due to the presence of just one woman in the school—the nurse and wife of Aristarco, Dona Ema—and the lack of contact with the external world.

Plot introduction
The general concept of the novel is that of describing the leaving of one's childhood dreams behind, and the consequences which come from growing up and having to face life. The main character, Sérgio, is commonly accepted as being an alter ego of Pompeia at a younger age.

Plot summary

Sérgio is left at the age of eleven on the doorsteps of the Ateneu by his father and enters the school for the first time. It immediately becomes clear the sexual references by the headmaster's statement to Sérgio's father in the beginning of the book: "You should see a coiffeur, and cut this blondy hair of yours. You know, the pretty boys in this school, don't go along very well". After, he is eventually approached by two older students—Sanches and Bento Alves—who try to engage into a homosexual relationship with him, but he does not accept the proposal. Sérgio then approaches a rebellious boy named Franco in order to avoid their company. Since Franco is constantly disciplined by the headmaster, Sérgio cuts his friendship with the boy, out of fear of facing the same fate. He then meets a boy named Egbert and becomes very close to him; their relationship does not develop beyond friendship mostly due to the sexual and emotional feelings Sérgio nourishes for the school's nurse—Dona Ema. Towards the end of the book, a student sets fire to the Ateneu, burning the whole structure down. The fire is a metaphor which represents the end of a chapter in Sérgio's life, as he progresses towards maturity.

Selected passages
Portuguese: ""English: "Thou shalt meet the world, told me my father, at the doorsteps of the Ateneu. Get courage for the fight! I later experienced the truth of that warning, which undressed me, in one gesture, of the illusions of a child educated exotically in the greenhouse of tenderness which is the regime of domestic love, different from what is found outside, so different, that it makes the poem of the maternal love seem to be a sentimental artifice, with the only advantage of making the creature more sensitive to the rude impression of the first teaching, burning search for vitality under the influence of a harsh new weather."

1880s novels
1880s LGBT novels
1888 Brazilian novels
Brazilian LGBT novels
Gay male romance novels
Gay male teen fiction
LGBT in Brazil
Naturalist novels
Novels with bisexual themes
Novels with gay themes
Realist novels

References